The first election to Dyfed County Council was held in April 1973. It was followed by the 1977 election. The vast majority of the councillors elected had been members of one of the three previous county authorities which were merged to create Dyfed, namely Cardiganshire, Carmarthenshire, and Pembrokeshire.

Overview

Cardiganshire
There were fifteen wards in Cardiganshire. Eight of these were won by Liberal candidates even though the parliamentary constituency was held by Labour since 1966.

A number of the elected councillors had served on the previous Cardiganshire County Council for many years, with John Rogers-Lewis and Morgan Davies having been members since 1937.

Carmarthenshire

The first elections, in line with the traditional pattern of local government in west Wales, resulted in an Independent majority. These Independents were, by and large, genuinely unattached to any political grouping. Of the political parties, Labour comfortably had the largest number of seats but were to be consistently outvoted by the Independents.

In the urban part of Carmarthenshire the contests were, in the main, between Labour candidates and one other opponent. In the rural areas, however, several Independent members of the former Carmarthenshire County Council, including aldermen, fought each other. In several cases, once these initial contests had taken place, the Independent councillor was returned unopposed.

The most significant contest, which attracted press coverage, was at Llangadog (Llandeilo No. 6 Ward) where the President of Plaid Cymru, Gwynfor Evans, a member of Carmarthenshire Council since 1949 was defeated by an Independent. The results for Plaid Cymru were disappointing and their one success in Carmarthen Rural No. 7 (the Whitland area) was partly caused by the non-Plaid vote being split between two Independent candidates.

Ward Results (Cardiganshire)

Aberaeron No. 1

Aberaeron No.2

Aberaeron No. 3

Aberystwyth No. 1

Aberystwyth No. 2

Aberystwyth No. 3

Aberystwyth Rural No.1

Aberystwyth Rural No. 2

Aberystwyth Rural No. 3

Cardigan

Lampeter

Teifiside No.1

Teifiside No.2

Teifiside No.3

Tregaron

Ward Results (Carmarthenshire)

Ammanford No.1

Ammanford No.2

Berwick

Burry Port East

Burry Port West

Carmarthen No.1

Carmarthen No.2

Carmarthen No.3

Carmarthen Rural No.1

Carmarthen Rural No.2

Carmarthen Rural No.3

Carmarthen Rural No.4

Carmarthen Rural no.5

Carmarethen Rural No.6

Carmarthen Rural No.7

Cwmamman

Felinfoel

Hengoed

Llandeilo No.1

Llandeilo No.2

Llandeilo No.3

Llandeilo No.4

Llandeilo No.5

Llandeilo No.6

Llanedi

Llanelli No.1

Llanelli No.2

Llanelli No. 3

Llanelli No.4

Llanelli No.5

Llanelli No. 6

Llanelli No.7

Llangennech

Llan-non

Newcastle Emlyn No.1

Newcastle Emlyn No.2

Pembrey

Pontyberem

Trimsaran

Westfa

Ward Results (Pembrokeshire)

Cemaes No. 1

Cemaes No. 2

Fishgaurd and Goodwick No. 1

Fishgaurd and Goodwick No. 2

Haverfordwest No.1

Haverfordwest No. 2

Haverfordwest Rural No. 1

Haverfordwest Rural No. 2

Haverfordwest Rural No. 3

Haverfordwest Rural No. 4

Haverfordwest Rural No. 5

Milford Haven No. 1

Milford Haven No. 2

Milford Haven No. 3

Narberth No. 1

Narberth No. 2

Narberth No. 3

Neyland and Llanstadwell

Pembroke No. 1

Pembroke No. 2

Pembroke No. 3

Pembroke Rural No. 1

Pembroke Rural No. 2

Tenby

References

1973
Dyfed